Myung Kyungjae is a biologist researching DNA repair pathways at the molecular level. He is a Distinguished Professor at the Ulsan National Institute of Science and Technology (UNIST) and the Director of the IBS Center for Genomic Integrity located on the UNIST campus. He is on the editorial board of various peer-reviewed journals and is a member of multiple scientific societies.

Education 
Majoring in zoology, Myung received his bachelor's from Seoul National University (SNU) graduating with honors in 1991. Continuing at SNU, he then majored in molecular biology and graduated with a M.S. in 1993 after studying under Professor Sang Dai Park. He completed a Ph.D. in molecular biology, cell biology and biochemistry from Brown University in 1999 under Professor Eric A. Hendrickson. His thesis was recognized with a Barry Jay Rosen Memorial Award.

Career
Myung did his postdoctoral training at Ludwig Institute for Cancer Research in the University of California, San Diego from 1999 to 2002 under Professor Richard Kolodner. He was awarded with a research fellowship from the Damon-Runyon-Winchell Cancer Research Foundation during the post-doc period. His first appointment was as an investigator and section head in the Genetics and Molecular Biology Branch of the National Human Genome Research Institute (NHGRI) under the National Institutes of Health. He was promoted to a senior investigator and section head in 2009, a position he held until 2014.

In addition to his position at the National Human Genome Research Institute, he concurrently held a position at POSTECH in the Division of Molecular and Life Science as an adjunct professor from 2011 until 2014. From 2013, he worked as an adjunct professor at KAIST in the Department of Biological Sciences and at the Ulsan National Institute of Science and Technology (UNIST) in the School of Nano-Bioscience and Chemical Engineering. The following year he fully relocated to Ulsan City where he became a distinguished professor in the School of Life Sciences at UNIST while also becoming the founding director of the IBS Center for Genomic Integrity, a collaboration with the Institute for Basic Science.

Myung has been a guest associate editor for the journal PLoS Genetics, a guest editor for Mutation Research, and been on the Editorial Board for Genome Instability and Disease, Genomics, Genome Integrity, and Molecular and Cellular Biology. He is also a member of the American Association for Cancer Research, Genetics Society of America, Korean-American Scientists and Engineers Association, Environmental Mutagenesis and Genomics Society, Korean Society for Biochemistry and Molecular Biology, and Korean Society for Integrative Biology.

Honors and awards 
 2017: Scholar of the Year, Genetic Society of Korea
 2014: Scientist of the Year Award, Korean-American Scientists and Engineers Association (KSEA) and Korean Federation of Science and Technology Societies (KOFST)
 2013: Outstanding Service Award, KSEA Washington Metro Chapter
 2013: US Government Service Award (10 years), NHGRI, NIH
 2012: Director of the Year, KSEA
 2008: Bea Singer Young Investigator Award (GRC DNA damage, Mutagenesis and Cancer)
 2008: US Government Service Award (5 years), NHGRI, NIH
 2006: Society of Biomedical Research/Chong Keun Dang Award for achievements in biomedical research
 2002: Sewoohue Award for Research Achievement
 2002: Leading Korean-American, Chooang ILBO
 2001: James Kerr Award for Research Excellence
 1999: Travel Grant Award, American Society for Microbiology
 1999: Barry Jay Rosen Memorial Award, Brown University

See also
 Orlando D. Schärer
 Anton Gartner

References

External links 
 IBS Center for Genomic Integrity
 Institute for Basic Science
 Kyungjae (KJ) Myung - Google Scholar
 Korean-American Scientists and Engineers Association (KSEA)
 Korean Federation of Science and Technology Societies (KOFST)
 Damon Runyon Fellowship Award Overview - Damon Runyon Cancer Research Foundation

Living people
Institute for Basic Science
Academic staff of KAIST
National Institutes of Health faculty
South Korean biologists
1968 births
Seoul National University alumni
Brown University alumni
South Korean scientists